Stanton Elementary School may refer to:
 M. Hall Stanton Public School
 Stanton Elementary School - El Paso, Texas - El Paso Independent School District
 Stanton Elementary School - Stanton, Texas - Stanton Independent School District